French rock is a form of rock music produced in France, primarily with lyrics in the French language.

French rock was born as early as mid-1950s, when writer, songwriter and jazz player Boris Vian wrote parody rock songs for Magali Noël or Henri Salvador. Although Vian despised rock and wrote these songs as attacks, they are highly acclaimed by French critics today and considered precursors.

The first real French rock acts emerged at the end of the decade and in the beginning of the 1960s, with Johnny Hallyday achieving the most long-lasting success, while other acts like Les Chaussettes noires, led by other French rock star Eddy Mitchell, and Les Chats sauvages (led by Dick Rivers) contributed to the emergence of the genre, the last band writing the first real classic French rock song, Twist à Saint-Tropez. The emergence of the yé-yé movement slowed the commercial success of French rock, although some names like Antoine, Jacques Dutronc, Nino Ferrer and Michel Polnareff emerged in the middle of the 1960s and did have success, while others like Ronnie Bird or Les Variations (who are commonly considered forerunners of French hard rock) achieved cult status.

In the 1970s, France saw the arrival of Alan Stivell's Breton folk-rock as well as a wave of progressive rock bands like Ange, Magma, Gong (whether they are actually a French band is debatable), Triangle, Dynastie Crisis, Shylock, Eskaton, Atoll and Pulsar. There was also some glam rock acts, like The Frenchies or the controversial and cult artist Alain Kan. Jacques Higelin's album BBH 75, which doesn't fit in these categories and is more of a transitional album between the classic era rock sound (à la Rolling Stones) and punk rock, is considered a seminal milestone by French critics, while ex-yé-yé star Christophe became a successful pop-rock artist, especially with his seminal albums Les Paradis perdus and Les Mots bleus (which title song is considered a major classic). French punk rock also appeared, including bands like Starshooter, Stinky Toys,* Electric Callas, Oberkampf and Métal Urbain. It was during this period that a few other variety music artists - Catherine Ribeiro, Bernard Lavilliers and others -  flirted with rock, but without completely changing over. However, French singer Serge Gainsbourg's 70s output, which included the classic Histoire de Melody Nelson, the less accessible L'Homme à tête de chou and the reggae Aux armes et cætera, transitioned completely from chanson to rock (a move he started earlier in the 1960s) and offered French-language rock new classics. Another name to know is that of Gérard Manset, a cult artist who deliberately live in maintained obscurity, but whose ballad Il voyage en solitaire is a major song and progressive album La Mort d'Orion is a reference, and who has continued to collaborate with high-profile artists up to this day. French hard rock and heavy metal took off by the end of the decade, spearheaded by Trust.

Things changed course in the 1980s. The changing of the political culture was accompanied by an explosion in youth culture. This helped the emergence of a distinct French rock that could match the lucrativeness of American and British rock music. French progressive rock continued in the 1980s in relative obscurity, with the bands Dün, Terpandre and Emeraude achieving some underground success (but were met with critical indifference). The success of Téléphone (pub rock), which started in the 1970s but peaked in the 1980s, also took French rock to new levels. The new wave was dominated by Indochine, who sold enormously, as well as Alain Chamfort, overshadowing the works of critical darlings Taxi Girl or Jacno, but the genre also later saw the emergence of Étienne Daho, who would remain a major figure in French music up to this day. Another notable artist from the early 1980s is Axel Bauer, who scored a massive hit with the song Cargo. Charlélie Couture also marked its time with Comme un avion sans aile. The post-punk scene, although commercially unsuccessful, also featured critically acclaimed acts, such as Marquis de Sade, Hubert-Félix Thiéfaine, Orchestre rouge or Kas Product. The art rock band Les Rita Mitsouko enjoyed international success, while the decade also saw the emergence of Alain Bashung, who had been around since the 1960s but only started to have his first hits in the new wave era. Bashung would become the most critically acclaimed French rock singer in his home country, with several of his albums being now hailed as classics. There was also a second wave of French punk rock which included such acts as Bérurier Noir, Les Négresses Vertes, Les Garçons Bouchers, Les Wampas, Les Satellites or the seminal Mano Negra, which would make the genre evolve towards worldbeat (and whose leader Manu Chao would later have a worldwide successful solo career). The first major French indie rock act appeared: Les Thugs, who are considered a major reference of the scene up to this day. Finally, French hard rock and heavy metal really took shape in this decade, with the continuing success of Trust or that of other bands like ADX, Warning, Shakin' Street, Sortilège or Vulcain, and some early thrash-death metal acts like Agressor, Loudblast or Morsüre.

The 1990s, still dominated by Bashung's aura and output (including Osez Joséphine and the major classic Fantaisie militaire), also saw the emergence of Noir Désir (their first classic album, Veuillez rendre l'âme (à qui elle appartient) dated back from the late 80s), whose sound fitted well in the grunge movement, and their 1992 album Tostaky was a huge popular and critical success, still selling solidly decades after its release. French rock was dominated by punk (No One Is Innocent), funk (-M-, FFF, Sinclair) and Noir Désir-soundalikes like Aston Villa or Saez (a trend which would continue in the 2000s with Luke, Eiffel or Déportivo, for instance). The very popular Louise Attaque refined the Noir Désir sound to fit a more indie folk approach, which would still allow them to achieve enormous sales. More on the indie scene, Diabologum and later its offshoots Expérience and Programme would become leaders, with a sound influenced by Pavement's approach. Other notable artists include Dominique A and Miossec who would sport a more minimalistic approach, pop bands Billy ze Kick et les Gamins en Folie, Les Innocents or L'Affaire Louis' Trio, and post-rock band Kat Onoma. Pop-rock artists Alain Souchon, Laurent Voulzy and Francis Cabrel, although they had been around since the 1970s, enjoyed major commercial success during this period. French heavy metal saw the emergence of the cult black metal scene of the Légions Noires with Vlad Tepes, Mütiilation, Belkètre or Torgeist and other acts not associated with it like Blut Aus Nord and Belenos, and some nu metal acts on the course of the decade, including Mass Hysteria, Lofofora, Eths or Pleymo.

The 2000s would see, alongside bands still influenced by Noir Désir, a dilution of the rock sound, with acts like Benjamin Biolay or Phoenix incorporating rock in their music, while being closer to chanson for the former (in a Dominique A-influenced approach) and French touch for the latter. Other chanson-affiliated artists flirting with rock include Jeanne Cherhal, Keren Ann, La Grande Sophie, Camille, Anaïs, Cali, Raphael, Bénabar and ex-Les Innocents leader J. P. Nataf, and artists more specifically influenced by Biolay include Florent Marchet, Arman Méliès, Bertrand Belin and Albin de la Simone. It also saw the reemergence of ex-new wave patriarchs Indochine as an emo-influenced band, with their album Paradize selling enormously and becoming a new classic. The decades-old French heavy metal would enjoy an international emergence, with acts like Gojira or AqME, while the underground black metal scene would keep on striving with bands like Deathspell Omega, Peste Noire or the more experimental Alcest. On the indie rock scene, Dionysos would become extremely popular with their hit Song for Jedi from their best-seller Western sous la neige, while other acts like A.S. Dragon or Ultra Orange would have more confidential success. Indie acts Yelle and M83 would achieve most of their success abroad. The second half of the decade would see the emergence of a French garage rock revival scene, with BB Brunes, Plastiscines, the Cheeraks, Crash Normal, the Normals, Naast, Izïa, Alister, Mademoiselle K or Stuck in the Sound.

In the 2010s, notable acts include the art rock/new wave outfit La Femme and Christine and the Queens, and French comedy electro-rock band Shaka Ponk also started to achieve major hits. Other notable acts include indie rock band Frànçois & the Atlas Mountains (who were active since 2005 but started to obtain critical acclaim this decade, although achieving most of their success abroad), Britpop-influenced Archimède, pop artist Arnaud Fleurent-Didier, art rock band Moodoïd, and Gnawa-inspired Bab L' Bluz.

In the following lists, artists and groups are classified by their decade of origin, even if their career spans multiple decades, or if they took time to become famous.

1950s
 Magali Noël
 Henri Salvador
 Mac Kac
 Chou Rave Hageur et ses Hot Dogs

Note: Magali Noël and Henri Salvador's output was parody.

1960s

 Les 5 Gentlemen
 Frank Alamo
 Richard Anthony
 Antoine
 Brigitte Bardot
 Alain Bashung
 Ronnie Bird
 Les Blousons noirs
 Georges Braudel 
 Danny Boy et ses Pénitents
 Billy Bridge
 Les Chats sauvages
 Les Chaussettes noires
 Long Chris
 Christophe
 Clothilde
 Jean Bernard de Libreville
 Delphine
 Noël Deschamps
 Jacques Dutronc
 Nino Ferrer
 Les Fleurs de pavot
 Brigitte Fontaine
 Claude François
 Serge Gainsbourg
 France Gall
 Les Gam's
 Danyel Gérard
 Johnny Hallyday
 Françoise Hardy
 Anna Karina
 Herbert Léonard
 Charlotte Leslie
 Les Lionceaux
 Dany Logan et Les Pirates
 Gérard Manset
 Martin Circus
 Eddy Mitchell
 Monty
 Michel Paje
 Michel Polnareff
 Claude Puterflam
 Dick Rivers
 Sheila
 Yves Simon
 Les Sunlights
 Le Système Crapoutchik
 Jacqueline Taïeb
 Michèle Torr
 Stella Vander
 Les Variations
 Sylvie Vartan
 Pierre Vassiliu
 Dominique Walter
 Zoo
 Zouzou

1970s

Before punk

 Alpes (with Catherine Ribeiro)
 Ame Son
 Ange
 Alice
 Art Zoyd
 Atoll
 Au Bonheur des Dames
 Michel Berger
 Jane Birkin
 Bonneville
 Emmanuel Booz
 Francis Cabrel
 Jean-Patrick Capdevielle
 Catharsis
 Alain Chamfort
 Chico Magnetic band
 Pascal Comelade
 Joël Daydé
 Bill Deraime
 Dynastie Crisis
 Ergo Sum
 Eskaton
 Etron Fou Leloublan
 Léo Ferré
 Fille Qui Mousse
 Forgas
 The Frenchies
 Gong
 Dashiell Hedayat (aka Jack-Alain Léger)
 Heldon
 Jacques Higelin
 Ilous & Decuyper
 René Joly
 Alain Kan
 Komintern
 Michel Kricorian
 Catherine Lara
 Lard Free
 Bernard Lavilliers
 Mahjun
 Magma
 Albert Marcœur
 Jean-Pierre Massiera
 Thierry Matioszek
 Mona Lisa
 Moving Gelatine Plates
 Odeurs
 Richard Pinhas
 Potemkine
 Présence
 Pulsar
 Red Noise
 Renaud
 Rhésus O
 Véronique Sanson
 William Sheller
 Shylock
 Alain Souchon
 Taï Phong
 Tangerine
 Mama Béa Tekielski
 Hubert-Félix Thiéfaine
 Trans Europe Express
 Triangle
 Volcania
 Verto
 Laurent Voulzy
 Wapassou
 ZNR
Téléphone

After punk

 Asphalt Jungle
 Bijou
 Cyclope
 Dogs
 Edith Nylon
 Electric Callas
 Extraballe
 Jacno
 Little Bob
 Marie et les Garçons
 Marie France
 Marquis de Sade
 Métal Urbain
 Ocean
 Les Olivensteins
 Shakin' Street
 Starshooter
 Stinky Toys
 Strychnine
 Suicide Roméo
 Trust

1980s

 Les Ablettes
 ADX
 Agressor
 Attentat Rock
 Jean-Louis Aubert
 Les Avions
 Daniel Balavoine
 Banlieue Rouge
 Barbelés Cardiac
 Axel Bauer
 Louis Bertignac
 Bérurier Noir
 Blasphème
 Bernie Bonvoisin
 Buzy
 Café Noir
 Camera Silens
 Los Carayos
 Carte de séjour
 Chagrin d'amour
 Challenger
 Charles De Goal
 Chihuahua
 Coronados
 Patrick Coutin
 Charlélie Couture
 Étienne Daho
 Daniel Darc
 Dirty District
 Elli et Jacno
 Louis Deprestige
 Gill Dougherty
 Patrick Eudeline
 Mylène Farmer
 Fisc
 Charlotte Gainsbourg
 Gamine
 Les Garçons Bouchers
 Gogol Premier
 Jean-Jacques Goldman
 H-Bomb
 High Power
 Hot Pants
 Indochine
 Jad Wio
 Kas Product
 Killers
 La Souris Déglinguée
 Marc Lavoine
 Lili Drop
 Lio
 Les Lolitas
 Loudblast
 Ludwig von 88
 Mano Negra
 Marc Seberg
 Corinne Marienneau
 Massacra
 Mathématiques modernes
 Elli Medeiros
 Modern Guy
 Morsüre
 Jean-Louis Murat
 Les Négresses Vertes
 Niagara
 Noir Désir
 Norma Loy
 Oberkampf
 Orchestre rouge
 OTH
 Oui Oui
 Parabellum
 Vanessa Paradis
 Passion Fodder
 Paul Personne
 Les Playboys
 Raoul Petite
 Pigalle
 Les Porte Mentaux
 Presence
 Les Rita Mitsouko
 Rockin' Rebels
 Satan Jokers
 Les Satellites
 Les $heriff
 Sortilège
 Les Soucoupes violentes
 Squealer
 Stocks
 Taxi Girl
 Tear of a Doll
 Têtes Raides
 Les Thugs
 Tokow Boys
 Treponem Pal
 Tulaviok
 Tupelo Soul
 Arnold Turboust
 Les Valentins
 The Vietnam Veterans
 Les VRP
 Vulcain
 Les Wampas
 Warning
 Wild Child
 Wunderbach

1990s

 Dominique A
 L'Affaire Louis' Trio
 Air (French band)
 Anorexia Nervosa
 Antaeus
 Aston Villa
 Autour de Lucie
 Babylon Circus
 Belenos
 Belkètre
 Billy ze Kick et les Gamins en Folie
 Black Murder
 Blacklodge
 Blut Aus Nord
 Rodolphe Burger
 Burning Heads
 Calc
 Manu Chao
 Le Cri de la mouche
 Daisybox
 Daran et les chaises
 Diabologum
 Dionysos
 Dolly
 Doriand
 Eiffel
 Elend
 Elmer Food Beat
 Enhancer
 L'Esprit du clan
 Eths
 FFF
 Freedom for King Kong
 Gérald de Palmas
 Les Innocents
 Kat Onoma
 Philippe Katerine
 La Ruda first known as La Ruda Salska
 Lilicub
 Lofofora
 Louise Attaque
 Matthieu Chedid also known as simply -M-
 Marcel et son Orchestre
 The Married Monk
 Mass Hysteria
 Matmatah
 Mendelson
 Mercyless
 Merrimack
 Mickey 3D
 Miossec
 Mütiilation
 No One Is Innocent
 Nuit-blanches
 The Needs
 Les Ogres de Barback
 Osculum Infame
 Pleymo
 Portobello Bones
 Prohibition
 Pull
 Red Cardell
 Rinôçérôse
 La Rue Kétanou
 Saez
 Seth
 Silmarils
 Stormcore
 Svinkels
 Tagada Jones
 Rachid Taha
 Tanger
 Torgeist
 Ulan Bator
 Ultra Orange
 Uncommonmenfrommars
 Vlad Tepes
 Watcha
 Weepers Circus
 Welcome to Julian
 Yan et les Abeilles
 Zazie
 Zebda

2000s

 10 Rue d'la Madeleine
 AaRON
 Albin de la Simone
 Alcest
 Alister
 Aluk Todolo
 Anaïs
 Keren Ann
 AqME
 Arkhon Infaustus
 Asyl
 A.S. Dragon
 BB Brunes
 Bertrand Belin
 Bénabar
 Benighted
 Benjamin Biolay
 Black Bomb A
 Black Rain
 The Black Noodle Project
 The Blueberries
 Boxon
 Bukowski
 Café Bertrand
 Cali
 Calogero
 Camille
 The Cheeraks
 Jeanne Cherhal
 Crash Normal
 Dahlia
 Deathspell Omega
 Debout Sur Le Zinc
 Déportivo
 devianz
 Eiffel
 Expérience
 Frànçois & the Atlas Mountains
 Freedom For King Kong
 Frustration
 Gojira
 La Grande Sophie
 Hacride
 HushPuppies
 Ipecacuana
 Izïa
 K
 Kaolin
 Kyo
 The Little Rabbits
 Les Fatals Picards
 Lex Riders
 The Limiñanas
 Renan Luce
 Luke
 M83
 Mademoiselle K
 The Magnetix
 Florent Marchet
 Arman Méliès
 Hubert Mounier
 Music Is Not Fun
 Mustang
 Naast
 J. P. Nataf
 Nosfell
 Nouvelle Vague
 Nude
 Pep's
 Peste Noire
 Phoenix
 Plastiscines
 Pony Pony Run Run
 Programme
 Prototypes
 Quidam
 Olivia Ruiz
 Raphael
 Revolver
 Sexy Sushi
 Shades
 Shaka Ponk
 The Shapers
 Sidilarsen
 Spektr
 Stuck In The Sound
 Stupeflip
 Subway
 Superbus
 Tahiti 80
 Tarmac
 Temple of Baal
 Ultra Vomit
 Vanity Case
 Vegastar
 Wäks
 Wünjo
 Yelle

2010s

 Jeanne Added
 Aldaaron
 Archimède
 Bazar et Bémols
 Brigitte
 Caravaggio
 Détroit
 Fuzzy Vox
 
 Forever Pavot
 Grand Blanc
 Granville
 J.C. Satàn
 La Femme
 Éric Lareine & Leurs Enfants
 Lescop
 Mars Red Sky
 Melody's Echo Chamber
 Minuit
 Moodoïd
 Sutcliffe
 We Were Evergreen
 Woodkid
 Blankass
 Bab L' Bluz

French styles of music
French rock music
Patrica Kass